Orhan Aksoy (January 10, 1930 – January 22, 2008) was a Turkish director and screenwriter. He began his career in film as a projectionist in the now-defunct Saray cinema in Istanbul. He would direct over 90 films, and be a screenwriter for over 50, across his career.

Filmography
 Karateci Kız (1973)
 Ah Nerede (1975)
 Happy Days (1978)

Awards

Antalya Golden Orange Film Festival
 1970 – Won Best Film Award for Kinali Yapincak
 1973 – Won Best Film Award for Hayatmi bu
 1994 – Won Best Film Award for Yumusak ten

Style 
Aksoy became famous for his work on melodramas in the late 1960s and early 1970s. When melodramas began to lose their popularity in the 1980s, he became a noted director of musicals and romantic comedies.  It was his early work on melodramas which lead him to be regarded as being at the forefront of the 'muhalle' cinema movement in Turkey, where movies often emphasised family life, warm relationships and happy endings.

External links

References

1930 births
2008 deaths
Turkish film directors